Typophyllum is a genus of leaf-mimicking katydids belonging to the family Tettigoniidae.

Species

Typophyllum abruptum Brunner von Wattenwyl, 1895
Typophyllum acutum Vignon, 1925
Typophyllum bolivari Vignon, 1925
Typophyllum chlorophyllum Bolívar, 1890
Typophyllum cinnamum Bolívar, 1890
Typophyllum columbicum Brunner von Wattenwyl, 1895
Typophyllum contractum Brunner von Wattenwyl, 1895
Typophyllum curtum Vignon, 1926
Typophyllum eeckei Vignon, 1926
Typophyllum egregium Hebard, 1924
Typophyllum erosifolium Walker, 1870
Typophyllum erosum Stoll, 1787
Typophyllum flavifolium Saussure & Pictet, 1898
Typophyllum geminum Bolívar, 1890
Typophyllum gibbosum Vignon, 1925
Typophyllum helleri Brunner von Wattenwyl, 1895
Typophyllum histrio Brunner von Wattenwyl, 1895
Typophyllum inflatum Vignon, 1925
Typophyllum laciniosum Vignon, 1927
Typophyllum lacinipenne Enderlein, 1917
Typophyllum lunatum Pictet, 1888
Typophyllum modestum Piza, 1976
Typophyllum mortuifolium Walker, 1870
Typophyllum mutilatum Walker, 1870
Typophyllum pererosum Hebard, 1933
Typophyllum peruvianum Pictet, 1888
Typophyllum praeruptum Vignon, 1926
Typophyllum pseudocinnamum Vignon, 1926
Typophyllum quadriincisum Vignon, 1925
Typophyllum rufifolium Chopard, 1919
Typophyllum scissifolium Walker, 1870
Typophyllum siccifolium Bolívar, 1890
Typophyllum spurioculis Baker, Sarria-S., Morris, Jonsson & Montealegre-Z., 2017
Typophyllum trapeziforme Stoll, 1787
Typophyllum trigonum Vignon, 1925
Typophyllum truncatifolium Walker, 1870
Typophyllum undulatum Caudell, 1918
Typophyllum zingara Montealegre-Z. & Morris, 1999

Gallery

References

Tettigoniidae genera
Pterochrozinae
Orthoptera of South America